The 1908 Wabash Little Giants football team represented Wabash College during the 1908 college football season.  In Ralph Jones's first season as head coach, the Little Giants compiled a 2–6 record, but still managed to outscore their opponents 95 to 65, thanks to a 62–0 blowout of Franklin in the season opener, and a plethora of close losses against ,  St. Louis, Michigan Agricultural, Miami (OH), and Notre Dame, all of which were one score games.  

Wabash's most notable and impressive contest was against Notre Dame, when the Little Giant's held the 8–1 Fighting Irish to 8 points and scored 4 of their own, the best showing put up against the team besides Michigan.  The Little Giant's also held an undefeated Michigan Agricultural and Miami of Ohio to 6 points.

Schedule

References

Wabash
Wabash Little Giants football seasons
Wabash Little Giants football